Genesis Underground is the 2009 debut album of indie band Eye Alaska, released on July 7, 2009.

Track listing
"Walk Like a Gentleman" – 3:49
"Show Me DaLuv" (ft. VerBS) – 3:25
"Mutiny Off the Aleutian Coast by Rorrim Ehtni" – 3:05
"Star Pilot" (ft. VerBS) – 1:05
"American Landslide" – 3:29
"The Legion Night (Rorrim Ehtni Lived)" – 0:39
"Good to Go" – 4:14
"Miles Don't Mean Anything" – 3:47
"Rocky Road" – 4:07
"All Hail the High Sea" – 3:33
"Roll Right Over" - 3:40
"My Soul, My Surrender" - 4:13
"Intro to Pop.Fiction" - 1:58

2009 albums